Domenico della Rovere (1442 – 23 April 1501) was an Italian cardinal and patron of the arts.

Life 

He was born at Vinovo, near Turin, and was not a relative of Pope Sixtus IV (Francesco Della Rovere), who, however, favoured him in the hope of establishing a link between his humble Ligurian family and that of the Piedmontese counts of Vinovo.

In 1478 he was appointed as Bishop of Tarantaise succeeding his brother, Cristoforo. In the same year, on 10 February, he was created cardinal of San Vitale by Sixtus IV (one year later he exchanged the title with that of San Clemente). Also in 1478 he received the title of bishop of Montefiascone and Corneto, which he kept until his death. On 19 July 1482 he was appointed Apostolic Administrator of the diocese of Geneva, during the Sede vacante following the death of Joannes Ludovicus de Sabaudia. He was transferred to the diocese of Turin on 24 July 1482, only five days later, when the Bishop of Turin, Jean de Compoys, was transferred to Geneva.

In 1483, he laid the cornerstone for the new cathedral of S. Margherita in Montefiascone, and in his Last Will and Testament in 1501 he left money to continue the work, which had barely reached the level of the main floor of the church at the time of his death.

After Sixtus' death in 1484, he went to Rome to participate in the papal conclave, which elected Pope Innocent VIII. Della Rovere remained in Rome for most of the rest of his life, leaving the diocese of Turin in the hands of his vicars and procurators, including his nephew Giovanni Ludovico della Rovere. In Piedmont, he funded the Collegiate church of Saluzzo and the rebuilding of the Turin Cathedral, as well as a new castle in Vinovo to serve as his residence. In Piazza Scossacavalli, in the Borgo rione of Rome, he commissioned Pinturicchio the decoration (including the Semi-Gods Ceiling) of the Palazzo bearing his name, whose construction he had started in 1480, perhaps under design by Baccio Pontelli.

He died in Rome on 22 April 1501, having made his Last Will and Testament earlier on the same day, before lunch. He is now buried in the Turin Cathedral.

References

Further reading 
Alessi, G. C. (1984). "Biografia e bibliografia di Domenico della Rovere," in: Italia medioevale e umanistica 27 (1984), pp. 175–231. 
Romano, Giovanni (ed.) (1990). Domenico della Rovere e il Duomo Nuovo di Torino. Rinascimento a Roma e in Piemonte. Turin: Cassa di Risparmio di Torino. 

1442 births
1501 deaths
Domenico
People from the Province of Turin
15th-century Italian cardinals
Cardinal-nephews
15th-century Italian Roman Catholic archbishops